Therion (Greek for "wild animal" or "beast" (θηρίον)) may refer to:
 Therion (band), a Swedish metal band
 Therion (constellation), the name that the ancient Greeks gave to the constellation Lupus
 Therion (software), a cave cartography programme
 Therion (Thelema), a god in Thelema, consort of Babalon
 Therion (wasp), a genus of wasps
 The Beast (Revelation), a monster from the Book of Revelation

See also
 Therian (disambiguation)
 To Mega Therion (disambiguation)